Smržov may refer to:

 Smržov (Jindřichův Hradec District), a village in the Czech Republic
 Smržov (Hradec Králové District), a village in the Czech Republic